Protected areas of Eswatini include any geographical area protected for a specific use inside the landlocked country of Eswatini, in southern Africa. 

Within Eswatini there is a mix of national, private and community-owned protected areas. They include national parks, nature reserves, wildlife sanctuaries and game reserves.

National parks
 Hlane Royal National Park

Wildlife sanctuaries
 Mlilwane Wildlife Sanctuary

Game reserves
 Mbuluzi Game Reserve
 Dombeya Game Reserve
 Mkhaya Game Reserve

Nature reserves
 Hawane Nature Reserve
 Malolotja Nature Reserve
 Mantenga Nature Reserve
 Mlawula Nature Reserve
 Phophonyane Falls Nature Reserve
 Shewula Community Nature Reserve
 Simunye Nature Reserve

Other protected areas
 Bulembu National Landscape
 Hlane
 Makhonjwa National Landscape
 Mbuluzi
 Mhlosinga
 Mkhaya
 Mlilwane
 Muti Muti
 Phophonyane
 Nisela (private, unproclaimed)
 Nkhalashane Siza Ranch
 Sondeza National Landscape

Eswatini's involvement with various transfrontier parks
 Lubombo Conservancy, as part of the Lubombo Transfrontier Conservation Area
 Nsubane Pongola Transfrontier Conservation Area
 Songimvelo-Malolotja Transfrontier Conservation Area
 Usuthu-Tembe-Futi Transfrontier Conservation Area, incorporating Usuthu Gorge

Lubombo Conservancy
Situated in the Lubombo District, the conservancy is part of the Lubombo Transfrontier Conservation Area, which straddles the border between South Africa's KwaZulu-Natal province, southern Mozambique and the northeastern part of Eswatini. It includes the Hlane Royal National Park, the Mlawula Nature Reserve, the Shewula Community Nature Reserve, the Mbuluzi Game Reserve, the Nkhalashane Siza Ranch and the Inyoni Yami Swaziland Irrigation Scheme (IYSIS). It is Eswatini's largest conservancy area.

References